Owghan (also Romanized as Owghān; also known as Owqān) is a village in Howmeh Rural District, in the Central District of Sarab County, East Azerbaijan Province, Iran. At the 2006 census, its population was 1,600, in 360 families.

References 

Populated places in Sarab County